Johar Bendjelloul (born 1 September 1975) is a Swedish television presenter and journalist.

Since 2013, Bendjelloul has been hosting P1 Morgon at Sveriges Radio. Before that he was a television presenter at SVT1 for Gomorron Sverige, Babel, Kulturnyheterna and Aktuellt.

He has also done voice acting doing one of the characters in the children's movie Jack & Pedro.

Personal life
Johar is the son of Algerian-born physician Hacène Bendjelloul and Swedish translator and painter Veronica Schildt, making him grandson of actor Henrik Schildt.

His brother Malik Bendjelloul was an Academy Award-winning filmmaker for the documentary Searching for Sugar Man. Malik committed suicide on 13 May 2014 after struggling with depression, as Johar reported to the media.

References

External links

Swedish television hosts
1975 births
Living people
Journalists from Stockholm
20th-century Swedish journalists
Swedish people of Algerian descent